Rockaway Beach Boulevard, opened in 1886, was the first major east-west thoroughfare on the Rockaway Peninsula in the Borough of Queens in New York City. Much of its route parallels the Rockaway Freeway and the IND Rockaway Line above the Freeway. The boulevard first forks off at its eastern end from Beach Channel Drive at Beach 35th Street in Edgemere and merges once again with Beach Channel Drive by Jacob Riis Park shortly before the Marine Parkway–Gil Hodges Memorial Bridge.

Rather curiously, the Boulevard runs north of the Freeway from its eastern end, while Edgemere Avenue runs exactly south of the Freeway, until Beach 56th Street in Arverne, where the northern flank becomes Arverne Boulevard and Edgemere Avenue abruptly turns into Rockaway Beach Boulevard for the remainder of its run.

While the Boulevard served as the heart of a bustling business and entertainment district in the heart of the Rockaway Beach neighborhood, which included numerous hotels and amusement attractions, including the famous Rockaways' Playland, it was found that its original width could barely cope with the expanding traffic in its heyday. Much of the area in Arverne served by Rockaway Beach Boulevard was leveled through abortive urban renewal efforts in the 1960s.

Transportation
The IND Rockaway Line parallels Rockaway Beach Boulevard east Beach 116th Street. The Q22 runs on Rockaway Beach Boulevard east of Beach 73rd Street. The Q52+ Select Bus Service and Q53+ Select Bus Service run on Rockaway Beach Boulevard between Cross Bay Parkway and Beach 73rd Street and Beach 116th Street, respectively. The QM16 and QM17 express bus between Jacob Riis Park and Midtown runs on Rockaway Beach Boulevard west of Cross Bay Parkway and Beach 73rd Street, respectively.

References

Sources
Vincent Seyfried and William Asadorian, Old Rockaway, New York in Early Photographs, Dover Publications, Mineola, NY, 2000.

Streets in Queens, New York
Transportation in Rockaway, Queens